A caldron is a large metal pot for cooking.

Caldron may also refer to:
 Caldron (sex club)
 Caldron Falls (North Yorkshire), West Burton, England
 Caldron Linn (Idaho), a waterfall
 Caldron Peak, Canada

See also
 Cauldron (disambiguation)